Zob Ahan Basketball Club (Bashgah-e Beskâtbal-e Zubâhen Esfehan) is an Iranian professional basketball club based in Isfahan, Iran. They compete in the Iranian Basketball Super League. Zob Ahan has won a record seven Iranian Super League championships.

It is sponsored by the Isfahan Steel Company, which also goes by the name Zob Ahan. Zob Ahan basketball team is the basketball club of the multisport Zob Ahan Cultural and Sport Club.

Tournament records

Iranian Super League
 1993–94: Champions
 1994–95: Champions
 1995–96: 2nd place
 1996–97: Champions
 1997–98: 2nd place
 1998–99: Champions
 1999–00: Champions
 2000–01: Champions
 2001–02: Champions
 2003–04: 3rd place
 2004–05: 3rd place
 2005–06: 6th place
 2006–07: 4th place
 2007–08: 4th place
 2008–09: 2nd place
 2009–10: 2nd place
 2010–11: 2nd place
 2011–12: 6th place
 2013–14: 4th place
 2018–19: 5th place
 2019–20: 9th place

WABA Champions Cup
 1998: 3rd place
 2000: 2nd place
 2002: 4th place
 2003: 3rd place
 2010: 3rd place
 2011: 4th place

Asian Champions Cup
 1990: 4th place
 1995: 7th place
 1997: 8th place
 2000: 7th place
 2001: 9th place

Roster

Notable former players

External links
Official website
page on Asia-Basket

Basketball teams in Iran
Sport in Isfahan
Basketball teams established in 1969